Norris "Playboy" Phillips (June 18, 1916 - February 4, 1996) was an American professional baseball pitcher in the Negro leagues. He played with the Memphis Red Sox in 1942 and the Kansas City Monarchs in 1942 and 1943.

References

External links
 and Seamheads

Kansas City Monarchs players
Memphis Red Sox players
1916 births
1996 deaths
Baseball pitchers
Baseball players from Texas
20th-century African-American sportspeople